The Queens Community Board 11 is a local government in the New York City borough of Queens, encompassing the neighborhoods of Bayside, Douglaston–Little Neck, Auburndale, East Flushing, Oakland Gardens and Hollis Hills. It is delimited by Utopia Parkway to the west, 26th Avenue and Little Neck Bay to the north, the Nassau County border to the east and Horace Harding Expressway, Clearview Expressway and Grand Central Parkway to the south.

References

External links
Community information
Community Board No. 11
Profile of the Community Board

Community boards of Queens